Socket AM4 is a PGA microprocessor socket used by AMD's central processing units (CPUs) built on the Zen (including Zen+, Zen 2 and Zen 3) and Excavator microarchitectures.

AM4 was launched in September 2016 and was designed to replace the sockets AM3+, FM2+ and FS1b as a single platform. It has 1331 pin slots and is the first from AMD to support DDR4 memory as well as achieve unified compatibility between high-end CPUs (previously using Socket AM3+) and AMD's lower-end APUs (on various other sockets). In 2017, AMD made a commitment to using the AM4 platform with socket 1331 until 2020. AM5 succeeded the AM4 platform in late 2022 with the introduction of the Ryzen 7000 series.

Features 

 Support for Zen (including Zen+, Zen 2 and Zen 3) based family of CPUs and APUs (Ryzen, Athlon), as well as for some A-Series APUs and Athlon X4 CPUs (Bristol Ridge based on the Excavator microarchitecture)
 Supports PCIe 3.0 and PCIe 4.0
 Supports up to 4 modules of DDR4 RAM in dual-channel configuration

Heatsink 
The AM4 socket specifies the 4 holes for fastening the heatsink to the motherboard to be placed in the corners of a rectangle with a lateral length of 54×90 mm. Previous sockets have 48×96 mm.

Some heat sinks for older sockets are not compatible. Some cooler manufacturers, however, are reported to be offering brackets allowing previously manufactured coolers to work with AM4, while other coolers will be redesigned. Alternatively, some motherboard makers are including both AM3 and AM4 cooler mounting holes, allowing previous generation coolers to be used. AM4 coolers that use a two-pronged bracket approach (such as the AMD Wraith Prism) to mount the cooler will work with AM4 and all the way back to Socket 754/939.

Chipsets 

Socket AM4 is currently a base for 8 chipset models. While the processors for this socket have been designed as systems in a package (SiP), with the traditional northbridge and southbridge on board the processor, the motherboard chipset will increase the number of PCI Express lanes and other connectivity options. These connectivity options include: NVMe, SATA, and USB 3.2 Gen 2. There also exists chipset-less variations of A320 and X370, called A300 and X300 respectively, that rely solely on the I/O die integrated into the CPU; these platforms are designed solely for small form factor (SFF) systems where there is a possibility that there is not enough space on the board to fit an actual chipset; these 'chipsets' are also solely available for OEM use only and are not available for purchase with SFF boards.

Compatibility 
In 2020, AMD faced some criticism when it was announced on May 7 that its Zen 3-based Ryzen 5000 microprocessors would only be compatible with newer 500-series chipset AM4 motherboards. This was explained as motherboard BIOS's sizes not being large enough to support the full range of AM4 socket processors. This had upset some of the user base as, described by AnandTech, they "...had assumed that this meant any AM4 platform based motherboard would be able to accept all processor made from 2016 to 2020, including the new Zen 3...". After the announcement some motherboard manufacturers announced they were planning to add in support for Zen 3 processors via BIOS updates. 

On 19 May 2020, however, AMD changed its position and stated that Zen 3 would be coming to selected older X470 and B450 motherboards via a BIOS update. This would be achieved by disabling support for some older AM4 processors in the BIOS ROM in order to allocate space to support the newer processors.

On 12 November 2021, according to TechPowerUp,  ASUS and Gigabyte were the few vendors that allowed Ryzen 5000 on A320 motherboard, and according to Tom's Hardware, it was done by removing support for AMD's 7th Generation A-series and Athlon X4 series (Bristol Ridge) processors.

See also 
 Socket AM5
Socket TR4
 Socket sTRX4

Weblinks

References 

AMD sockets